Crassotornoceras is genus of ammonoids that lived during Upper Devonian period, from the base of Frasnian age until the base of Maenecoceras subvaricatum zone. Animals belonging to this genus had small subglobular conches with thin umbilicus. These were maybe ornamented by ribs and had biconvex growth lines. Suture had small, tongue-like adventitious lobe. Their fossils were found in United Kingdom, Germany, France, Belgium and Morocco.

References

Goniatitida genera
Tornoceratidae
Frasnian life
Famennian life